Laetitia Quist (born 8 November 2001) is a German female handball player for HSG Blomberg-Lippe and the German national team.

She made her debut on the German national team on 21 April 2022, against Greece.

She is part of the German 35-player squad for the 2022 European Women's Handball Championship in North Macedonia/Montenegro/Slovenia.

In September 2018, she was included by EHF in a list of the twenty best young handballers to watch for the future.

Achievements
Handball-Bundesliga Frauen:
Bronze: 2019

References

2001 births
Living people
People from Baden-Baden
Sportspeople from Baden-Württemberg
German female handball players